The Belgium women's national volleyball team represents Belgium in international women's volleyball competitions and friendly matches.

Their nickname is Yellow Tigers.

Competitive record

World Championship
 Champions   Runners-up   Third place   Fourth place

European Championship
 Champions   Runners-up   Third place   Fourth place

World Grand Prix

FIVB Nations League
 Champions   Runners-up   Third place   Fourth place

Current squad
The following is the Belgian roster in the 2018 FIVB Volleyball Women's Nations League squads.

Head coach: Gert Vande Broek

References

External links
Official national team website 
Official KBVBV website
FIVB profile

National women's volleyball teams
Women's volleyball in Belgium
Women's national sports teams of Belgium